Passerculus is a genus of birds that belongs to the New World sparrow family Passerellidae. While formerly considered to include just the Savannah sparrow (P. sandwichensis), recent studies by Birdlife International indicate 3 Savannah sparrow subspecies should promoted to separated species, as result, that there 4 species in the genus. Species found in this genus include:

 Savannah sparrow, Passerculus sandwichensis
 Large-billed sparrow, Passerculus rostratus
 Belding's sparrow, Passerculus guttatus
 San Benito sparrow, Passerculus sanctorum

References 

Passerellidae
Bird genera
American sparrows
Taxa named by Charles Lucien Bonaparte